The Event is a 2003 drama film directed by Thom Fitzgerald. It tells the story of Matt Shapiro (Don McKellar) who has died in Manhattan, resulting in an aborted 9-1-1 call. Attorney Nick DeVivo (Parker Posey) interviews Matt's friends and family to piece together a portrait of Matt's life and finally his death.

The ultra-low-budget film stars an ensemble of respected actors including Olympia Dukakis, Brent Carver, Sarah Polley, Dick Latessa, Joanna P. Adler, Jane Leeves, Rejean Cournoyer, Joan Orenstein, McKellar and Posey.  It was written by Steven Hillyer, Tim Marback with director Fitzgerald, and produced by Bryan Hofbauer, Vicki McCarty (exec), Robert Flutie (exec).

The Event premiered at the Sundance Film Festival where it received three standing ovations.  It was distributed by ThinkFilm in the U.S.

Cast

 Joanna Adler (billed as Joanna P. Adler) as Gaby Shapiro-Schnell
 Chris Barry as Third Little Maid
 Walter Borden as Fred
 Ray Brimicombe as Desk Sergeant
 Laura Cahoot as Bride
 Brent Carver as Brian Knight
 Linda Carvery as Doctor
 Rejean Cournoyer (billed as Réjean Joseph Cournoyer) as Rory Metzler
 Lucy Decoutere as Jody
 Richard Donat as Undertaker
 Chase Duffy as Assistant District Attorney
 Olympia Dukakis as Lila Shapiro
 Tim Dunn as Ping Pong Player
 Travis Ferris as NYPD Officer
 Thom Fitzgerald as Vagimar Director
 Robert Fucito as China Bob
 Ian Gilmore as Second Little Maid
 Glen Michael Grant as Andy Campbell
 Steven Hillyer as Paramedic
 Celeste Jankowski as String Quartet Member No.1
 Dick Latessa as Uncle Leo
 Jane Leeves as Mona Rothchild
 Tim Marback as Paramedic No. 2
 Gianna Marciante as Lilian Schnell
 Jaclyn Markowitz as Amelia Schnell
 Vicky McCarty as Princess Leia Kapui Schwartz
 Don McKellar as Matt Shapiro
 Ruth Moore as Dr. Fisher
 Carla Morton as Clinic Nurse
 Ken Nagami as String Quartet Member No.2
 Marcia Olsen as Sick Girl
 Joan Orenstein as Angela DeVivo
 Doug Pettigrew as Canadian Sailor
 Sarah Polley as Dana Shapiro
 Parker Posey as Nick Devivo
 Cynthia Preston as Amy Eisner
 Walker Richards as Wedding Photographer
 Susan Sayle as String Quartet Member No.3
 Jamie Stevens as Bartender
 Studio as a Drag Queen
 Darryl Tannahill as Detective
 Chaz Thorne as Chris Devivo
 Miss Vicky as a Drag Queen
 Cecil Wright as City Clerk Official
 Mike Younger as Cowboy
 Theresa Zong as Grumpy Lady on Plane
 Christina Zorich as Judy Campbell

Awards
 ACCTV Genie Award (nominated)—Olympia Dukakis, Best Actress in a Supporting Role
 Atlantic Film Festival, Atlantic Canadian Award (win)—Thom Fitzgerald, Best Direction
 Atlantic Film Festival, Atlantic Canadian Award (win)—S. Hillyer, T. Marback, Best Screenplay
 Atlantic Film Festival, Atlantic Canadian Award (win)—D'Arcy Poultney, Best Art Direction
 Atlantic Film Festival, Atlantic Canadian Award (win)—Christopher Cooper, Best Editing
 Atlantic Film Festival, Atlantic Canadian Award (win)—Joan Orenstein, Best Actress
 ACTRA Awards, ACTRA Maritimes Award Outstanding Male Performance, Rejean Cournoyer
 Berlin International Film Festival, Teddy Award: Reader Jury of the "Siegessäule" Award, Thom Fitzgerald
 Golden Trailer Awards (nominated)—Golden Trailer, Best Independent
 Indianapolis LGBT Film Festival—Audience Award, Best Overall Film
 L.A. Outfest—Grand Jury Award, Outstanding Actress, Olympia Dukakis
 Seattle International Film Festival Emerging Master Showcase Award—The Event and The Wild Dogs

References

External links
 

2003 drama films
2003 LGBT-related films
2003 films
American LGBT-related films
Canadian LGBT-related films
English-language Canadian films
2000s English-language films
Films directed by Thom Fitzgerald
HIV/AIDS in American films
Films scored by Christophe Beck
American drama films
LGBT-related drama films
Films shot in Nova Scotia
HIV/AIDS in Canadian films
2000s American films
2000s Canadian films